1970 World Cup may refer to:

 1970 Alpine Skiing World Cup
 1970 FIFA World Cup
 1970 London to Mexico World Cup Rally
 1970 Rugby League World Cup
 1970 World Cup (men's golf)